The 1939 Maryland Terrapins football team was an American football team that represented the University of Maryland in the Southern Conference (SoCon) during the 1939 college football season. In their fourth and final season under head coach Frank Dobson, the Terrapins compiled a 2–7 record (0–1 in conference), finished in 14th place in the SoCon, and were outscored by a total of 106 to 64.

Schedule

References

Maryland
Maryland Terrapins football seasons
Maryland Terrapins football